Emmanuel Alejandro Ayala Ochoa (born 31 August 1995) is a Mexican footballer who plays as a midfielder for Catedráticos Elite F.C.

References

1995 births
Living people
Mexican footballers
Association football midfielders
Leones Negros UdeG footballers
Ascenso MX players
Liga Premier de México players
Sportspeople from Tijuana
Footballers from Baja California